AJ Bell is a British public limited company that provides online investment platforms and stockbroker services. It is listed on the London Stock Exchange and is a constituent of the FTSE 250 Index.

History
The company was formed in Manchester by Andy Bell and Nicholas Littlefair in 1995. The company was the subject of an initial public offering valuing the business at £675 million in November 2018.

Operations
The company currently has £71.5 billion of assets under administration and 449,000 customers as of 31 December 2022. Its main platform business operates under four core brands:

 AJ Bell is a direct-to-customer platform, offering a low-cost SIPP, ISA and Dealing (Trading) Account.
 AJ Bell Investcentre offers an SIPP, ISA and general investment account (GIA) and is only available to customers via Financial Conduct Authority (FCA) authorised financial advisers.
 AJ Bell Platinum is a bespoke SIPP and SSAS provider offering customers a bespoke (custom) service.
 AJ Bell Securities is the company's stockbroking arm.

The company also provides third party SIPP administration services and owns a specialist financial publishing business in London known as AJ Bell Media. AJ Bell was recognised as a Which? Recommended Provider for each of the three years, 2019, 2020 and 2021.

References

External links

1995 establishments in England
Companies based in Manchester
Financial services companies established in 1995
Investment management companies of the United Kingdom
Companies listed on the London Stock Exchange
Publicly traded companies
1995 establishments in the United Kingdom